Majdabad (also Romanized as Majdābād) is a village in Majdabad Rural District, in the Central District of Marvdasht County, Fars Province, Iran. At the 2006 census, its population was 3,143, in 695 families.

References 

Populated places in Marvdasht County